SeaTac is a common nickname for Seattle–Tacoma International Airport.

It may also refer to:

SeaTac, Washington, USA; a city in the Seattle-Tacoma metropolitan area
SeaTac/Airport station, a light rail station in SeaTac, WA, USA
Seattle metropolitan area, which includes Tacoma
Federal Detention Center, SeaTac (FDC SeaTac)
The Commons at Federal Way, formerly SeaTac Mall

See also
Seatack, Virginia, a neighborhood in Virginia Beach, Virginia